Hyloxalus whymperi, sometimes known as the Tanti rocket frog, is a species of frog in the family Dendrobatidae.
It is endemic to west-central Ecuador and only known from Tanti (a farm, the type locality) and near San Francisco de Las Pampas, Pichincha Province. It is a poorly known species.

Etymology
Hyloxalus whymperi is named after Edward Whymper, who collected the holotype during his expedition to Ecuador in 1879–1880.

Taxonomy
The holotype from Tanti is in poor condition, allowing describing few characters precisely. Frogs from Francisco de Las Pampas resemble the holotype and the original description, but until fresh material from the type locality are obtained, their true identity remains uncertain. It may be the same species as Ameerega erythromos (Vigle & Miyata, 1980), although the latter is a different species from the specimens from Francisco de Las Pampas.

Description
Males measure  in snout–vent length and have moderately robust body (adult females are unknown). Abdomen is black with white spots. Skin on all surfaces is smooth.

Habitat and conservation
Its natural habitats are very humid premontane forests. Breeding habitat is unknown but presumably the tadpoles develop in streams. It is threatened by habitat loss caused by agriculture and logging.

References

whymperi
Amphibians described in 1882
Amphibians of Ecuador
Endemic fauna of Ecuador
Taxonomy articles created by Polbot
Taxobox binomials not recognized by IUCN